The term Internal Service refers to a collection of Directorate-Generals and Services within the European Commission that provide services to the policy-making DGs or perform set administrative tasks.  They are not policy-making themselves.

Structure
 Budget 
 Bureau of European Policy Advisers (BEPA)
 Informatics 
 Infrastructures and Logistics 
 Brussels (OIB) 
 Luxembourg (OIL)
 Internal Audit Service (IAS) 
 Interpretation
 Legal Service 
 Personnel and Administration 
 Translation (DGT)

External links
 European Commission DGs and Services

Directorates-General in the European Commission